Sŵnami are a Welsh indie rock group from Dolgellau, north-west Wales, who sing predominantly in Welsh. They won the Welsh Language Album of the Year prize at the 2016 National Eisteddfod of Wales. Their name is a play on the word 'tsunami' and the Welsh word for sound, "Sŵn", to convey the idea of a wave of sound.

Background
Sŵnami was formed around the beginning of 2011. The band's lead singer is Bangor University graduate Ifan Davies, who is from outside Llanegryn, Gwynedd. The other members of the band are Ifan Ywain (guitar), Gerwyn Murray (bass), Lewis Williams (drums), Gruff Jones (synth). They describe their style as "rocky with a bit of synth".

The band won the Brwydr Y Bandiau (Battle of the Bands) at the 2011 National Eisteddfod in Wrexham. In 2012 they beat nine other bands to win Wakestock Battle of the Bands and secure a place on the line up of the Welsh festival.

In 2015 Sŵnami won awards for Best EP or Single (for their single "Cynnydd" / "Gwenwyn") and Best Video (for "Gwenwyn") at the Welsh Y Selar music awards.

The band's first album, Sŵnami, was nominated for the Welsh Music Prize in 2016 and was the winner of Welsh-Language Album of the Year at the 2016 National Eisteddfod held in Abergavenny.

Ifan Davies (lead singer) also plays guitar for Yws Gwynedd and Yr Eira, and Lewis Williams plays the drums for Candelas.

Discography

Singles

EPs and albums

References

External links
 

Welsh-language bands
Welsh pop music groups
Musical groups established in 2011
Welsh indie rock groups
2011 establishments in Wales
People from Dolgellau